The 1906 Notre Dame football team represented the University of Notre Dame in the 1906 college football season.

Schedule

References

Notre Dame
Notre Dame Fighting Irish football seasons
Notre Dame football